The Calcaire de Caen or Calcaires de Caen Formation; French for Caen Limestone, is a geological formation in France. It dates back to the mid-Bathonian of the Jurassic. It was often quarried for building work and is referred to as Caen Stone.

Vertebrate fauna 
Indeterminate sauropod remains located in the Département Du Calvados, France.

See also 
 List of dinosaur-bearing rock formations

References 

Geologic formations of France
Jurassic System of Europe
Middle Jurassic Europe
Jurassic France
Bathonian Stage
Limestone formations
Paleontology in France
Formations